The Northeastern State RiverHawks football program represents Northeastern State University in college football and competes in the NCAA Division II. In 2012, Northeastern State became member of the Mid-America Intercollegiate Athletics Association (MIAA), and has remained in the league. NSU's home games are played at Doc Wadley Stadium in Tahlequah, Oklahoma.

Northeastern's football program dates back to 1909. The RiverHawks claim twenty-one conference championships, and appeared in four NAIA football championships in 1958, 1980, 1994, and 1995.

The team is currently coached by J. J. Eckert, who began his tenure in 2019.

Conference affiliations
 1997–2010: Lone Star Conference
 2011: NCAA Division II independent
 2012–present: Mid-America Intercollegiate Athletics Association

Championships

National championship seasons 

 Conference championships (21)

Stadium

The Riverhawks have played their home games at Doc Wadley Stadium since 1964. The current capacity of the stadium is at 8,300.

See also

References

External links
 

 
American football teams established in 1909
1909 establishments in Oklahoma